Suzuki Motorcycle India, Private Limited (SMI) is the wholly owned Indian subsidiary of Suzuki, Japan. It was the third Suzuki automotive venture in India, after TVS Suzuki (1982–2001) and Maruti Suzuki (1982). In 1982, the joint-venture between Suzuki Motor Corporation and TVS Motor Company incorporated and started production of two wheelers in India. In 2001, after separating ways with TVS motor company, the company was re-entered as Suzuki Motorcycle India, Private Limited (SMI), in 2006. The company has set up a manufacturing facility at Gurgaon, Haryana with an annual capacity of 5,40,000 units.

Vehicles

Cycles
 Gixxer 150
 Gixxer SF 150
 Gixxer 250
 Gixxer SF 250
 V-Strom 250 sx

Scooters
 Access 125
 Access 125 SE
 Burgman Street
 Avenis 125 (In Black, Blue and Green Colour)

Sports bikes
 Hayabusa GSX 1300R
 V-Strom 650
Katana

ATVs
 Ozark 250
 Quadsport Z400

Discontinued

Scooters
 Suzuki Swish
 Suzuki Let's

Motorcycles/sports bikes
Suzuki GS150R
Suzuki Intruder 155
Suzuki Hayate 110
Suzuki Heat 125
Suzuki Inazuma 250
Suzuki Slingshot 125
Suzuki Slingshot Plus 125
Suzuki Zeus 125
 GSX-S1000F ABS
 GSX-R1000 ABS
 GSX-R1000R ABS
 GSX-S1000 ABS
Intruder M1800R
 Intruder M1800R BOSS Edition
 V-Strom-1000 ABS

References

Suzuki
Indian subsidiaries of foreign companies
Manufacturing companies of India
Motorcycle manufacturers of India